The 1996 Toyota Atlantic Championship season was the 23rd season of the formula race car Atlantic Championship. It was contested over 12 races between March 3 and September 7, 1995. The Player's Toyota Atlantic Championship Drivers' Champion was Patrick Carpentier. All teams had to utilize Toyota engines. In C2-class 23 different drivers competed, but none of them for the whole season.

Calendar

Note:

Race 1 was held on a combination track;  cars used the esses off the backstretch for safety reasons.

Final points standings

Driver

Main championship

For every race the points were awarded: 20 points to the winner, 16 for runner-up, 14 for third place, 12 for fourth place, 11 for fifth place, winding down to 1 point for 15th place. Lower placed drivers did not award points. Additional points were awarded to the pole winner (1 point) and to the driver leading the most laps (1 point). C2-class drivers were also able to score points in the main class.

C2-Class championship

Points system see above.

Note:

No more competitors in C2-class.

See also
1996 IndyCar season
1996 Indy Lights season
1996 Indy Racing League season
1996–1997 Indy Racing League season

External links
ChampCarStats.com

Atlantic
Atlantic Season, 1996
Atlantic Championship seasons
Atlantic